Cymindis americana is a species of ground beetle in the subfamily Harpalinae. It was described by Pierre François Marie Auguste Dejean in 1826.

References

americana
Beetles described in 1826